CBV-FM is a Canadian radio station, which broadcasts the programming of Radio-Canada's Première network in Quebec City. The station broadcasts at 106.3 FM from Mount Bélair.

The station was first launched in 1934 as AM 950 CRCK, Quebec City's second-oldest radio station. It was an affiliate of the Canadian Radio Broadcasting Commission, airing programming in both English and French. It became a part of the Canadian Broadcasting Corporation in 1936. It adopted the callsign CBV in 1938, becoming the second station in Radio-Canada's French radio network. In 1941, CBV moved to 980 kHz.

In 1974, CBVX-FM, broadcasting Radio-Canada's FM network, was launched. It was initially known as CBV-FM.

On July 4, 1997, the CBC received CRTC approval to convert CBV to 106.3 FM. After the move to FM, the AM signal was discontinued. It took over the CBV-FM callsign, and the existing CBV-FM became CBVX-FM.

Transmitters

References

External links
Ici Radio-Canada Première
 

BV
BV
Canadian Radio Broadcasting Commission
BV
Radio stations established in 1934
1934 establishments in Quebec